The Protection of Life and Property in certain parts of Ireland Act 1871 or Protection of Life and Property (Ireland) Act 1871 (34 & 35 Vict c 25) was an Act of the Parliament of the United Kingdom. It was one element of the special emergency legislation that had been applied to Ireland by Westminster during the 19th and 20th Centuries. The Act was also known as the Westmeath Act

The Act permitted the arrest and detention without trial of persons reasonably suspected of membership in a secret society and effectively suspended habeas corpus in Ireland.

References

United Kingdom Acts of Parliament 1871
Acts of the Parliament of the United Kingdom concerning Ireland
1871 in Ireland
Emergency laws in the United Kingdom